Sardar F. S. Lodhi (born Sardar Farooq Shaukat Khan Lodhi; 17 June 1931  14 September 2004) was a lieutenant-general in the Pakistan Army who served 8th governor of Balochistan from 23 March 1984 to 7 July 1984 and 22nd minister of Interior from 22 January 1985 to 24 March 1985. He was formerly associated with the Pakistan Army as a writer.

Early life and education 
Lodi was born on 17 June 1931 in Baghdad, Iraq to Sardar Mohammad Abdullah Khan Lodi, an Imperial civil servant who was posted in Iraq in the British Indian Army at the department of finance. Lodi's father was married to a prominent woman, Jamila Khanum. They returned to Srinagar, Jammu and Kashmir which was their hometown. His father was later appointed as accountant-general in the government of Jammu and Kashmir.

F. S Lodhi did his schooling at St. Joseph's Higher Secondary School, Baramulla. He obtained his FSC from S. P. College, Srinagar. He later obtained an uncertain professional degree from Pakistan Military Academy. He also did his LLB from an uncertain university.

Career 
He started his career after obtaining his degree from Military Academy. He was first posted to the East Bengal Regiment in the East Pakistan where he later commanded an uncertain regiment. Prior to his promotion to the rank of colonial, he was sent to Staff College, Camberley by the Pakistan Army for further training. During the Indo-Pakistani War of 1971, he commanded a brigade in Lahore upon his promotion to the rank of brigadier. After conflict ended between the two countries, he was appointed as an instructor with the second assignment as a chief instructor at the Command and Staff College. He again went to the UK for professional military training.

After he served as a brigadier, he was then promoted to the rank of major general during which, he commanded a division in Kharian, Punjab. He later served as a divisional commander during the government of Muhammad Zia-ul-Haq. As a major general, he was posted as Chief of General Staff from 1978 to March 1980. He was also assigned to command IV Corps with his last promotion of lieutenant general, during which he also served as governor of Punjab.

After serving as a governor of Punjab, he was sent from Rawalpindi to Quetta with his second appointment as governor of Balochistan in 1984. However, his Cessna aircraft crushed in a remote area and pilot and ACD died in aviation accident and Lodi received minor injuries. He was admitted to a local hospital where the doctors gave him blood transfusion that infected him with malaria and later hepatitis C. The infectious disease damaged his liver and he was subsequently airlifted to the Combined Military Hospital Rawalpindi where he recovered from disease, and he resumed his duties in Quetta. After retiring from the services, he moved to Karachi on the request of his wife where he spent his last days and started teaching in a law college in Karachi, and used to wrote articles for newspapers, including Dawn newspaper and Outlook magazine.

As aa defence writer, he was among the others who outlined the use of the basic principles of nuclear doctrine of Pakistan.

Articles 
Lt. Gen. Sardar F. S. Lodhi (Retd., Pakistan Army), Pakistan’s Nuclear Doctrine, Pakistan Defence Journal, 1999.

References

Further reading 
 

1931 births
2004 deaths
Military personnel from Karachi
Pakistan Military Academy alumni
Pakistani military personnel of the Indo-Pakistani War of 1971
Graduates of the Staff College, Camberley
Interior ministers of Pakistan
Governors of Balochistan, Pakistan
Defence and security analysts in Pakistan
Pakistani generals